Maurice Hurley (died 1586) was a 17th-century Roman Catholic prelate.

He served as Bishop of Emly:
from his  consecration on 7 September 1623 until his death in September 1646. There is a stone in the wall at St  Ailbe's National School, which was taken from Emly Cathedral when it was demolished in 1827.

References 

17th-century Roman Catholic bishops in Ireland
Bishops appointed by Pope Gregory XV
1646 deaths